The Annam tube-nosed bat (Murina annamitica) is a species of bat in the family Vespertilionidae. It is found in Laos, Thailand and Vietnam.

References

Murininae
Mammals described in 2012
Mammals of Laos
Mammals of Thailand
Mammals of Vietnam
Mammals of Southeast Asia